Otterington Hall is a Grade II listed mansion in South Otterington, near Northallerton, North Yorkshire, England.

Otterington Hall lies in South Otterington, three miles south of Northallerton, on the A167.

One of the earlier occupants, from before 1831 until his death in 1837, was Captain John George Boss (1781–1837) R.N. He had a distinguished naval career, being involved in the capture of several French vessels and the protection of British trading interests in the Caribbean during the Napoleonic Wars. He was presented with a silver-gilt cup in 1812 with the following inscription: "Presented to JOHN GEORGE BOSS ESQR. Captain of his B. Majesty's Sloop RHODIAN, For his Zeal and Valor in the destruction of Two French Privateers & defending a Convoy From ST JAGO DE CUBA to HENEAGA, Diego, Monga, Pasqual Privintos, Pedro Blanco Carariego, June 28th 1812". The cup was recently sold at Bonhams for over £40,000. He was a Member of Parliament for the Northallerton constituency (1832–1835) and he gained the rank of captain in November 1833. He married twice: Charlotte Robinson (née Pennyman) in 1814, who died in 1832 aged 56, and Elizabeth Wylie in 1834.

Otterington Hall was the birthplace of British anti-fascist, linguist, and photographer, Alec Wainman.

It was home to the Furness family for many years, and they were responsible for planting much of its topiary gardens from the 1920s onwards, "one of the best topiary gardens in England and certainly the best in Yorkshire".

It has been home to Andy Preston, the Mayor of Middlesbrough and a former hedge fund manager, and his wife since at least 2007. In 2015, Preston was criticised for using his parents' Middlesbrough address on his nomination papers, rather than that of his actual home, but he denied breaking election rules.

References

Grade II listed buildings in North Yorkshire
Country houses in North Yorkshire
Grade II listed houses